Hyposmocoma maestella is a species of moth of the family Cosmopterigidae. It was first described by Lord Walsingham in 1907. It is endemic to the Hawaiian island of Kauai.

External links

maestella
Endemic moths of Hawaii